The Brogo Reserve is a  nature reserve, owned (since 1995) and managed by Bush Heritage Australia, located at the north-eastern end of the Bega Valley in south-eastern New South Wales— south of Sydney and  north of Bega.

Features

Landscape and vegetation

Brogo encompasses three forested ridges, with granite outcrops, separated by fern gullies. Habitat types include riparian oak forest along the Brogo River, dry grass forest, dry rainforest and wet shrub forest.

Fauna

Mammal species present on Brogo include the sugar glider, common wombat and long-nosed bandicoot. The reserve is home to 70 indigenous bird species, include the powerful owl.

See also

 Protected areas of New South Wales

References

External links
 Bush Heritage Australia

Bush Heritage Australia reserves
Nature reserves in New South Wales
1995 establishments in Australia
South Coast (New South Wales)